Timothy Keith Moore (born October 2, 1970) is an American attorney and politician who has been the speaker of the North Carolina House of Representatives since 2015. A Republican, Moore represents the 111th State House District, which includes Cleveland County. Moore was first elected to the state House in 2002.

Early life and education
Moore was born on October 2, 1970, in Kings Mountain, North Carolina, in the western part of the state.  As a teenager, Moore worked at the state General Assembly as a page, later interning for a state senator.

Moore first attended Campbell College, where he joined the College Republicans. After two years he transferred to University of North Carolina, where he completed a B.A. in 1992. He was active in the student government at both colleges. He took a fight to the UNC student Supreme Court in an effort to add more members to the Student Congress. In 1995, Moore graduated from the Oklahoma City University School of Law.

Legal and business career
In 1995, Moore joined a law firm in the Cleveland County, North Carolina town of Shelby. He opened his own law practice in Kings Mountain in 2009, representing business and individual clients.

In 2015, Moore was hired by the Cleveland County Commission as an attorney for the county, serving in this role simultaneously with his position as speaker of the state House.

Moore co-owns 67 Motors, a Forsyth County metal recycling business.

Early political career

When Moore was 26, he was elected chair of the Cleveland County Republican Party in 1997. That same year, he was also appointed to the UNC Board of Governors; he was the youngest person to be appointed to that position.

North Carolina House of Representatives
Moore was first elected to the North Carolina House of Representatives in 2002, after defeating the incumbent House Majority Whip, Democratic Representative Andy Dedmon. A staunch conservative Republican, Moore spent his first four terms in office in the minority party, as Democrats then controlled the House. In 2010, the Republicans won control of the House, and Speaker Thom Tillis appointed Moore to the powerful post of chairman of the Rules Committee, where he became known for abruptly cutting off many floor debates.

As part of the Republican leadership team in the House, Moore helped pass "sweeping legislation to lower taxes on business, tighten rules on abortion and voting, and decline to extend Medicaid coverage to 500,000 uninsured North Carolinians." Moore opposes same-sex marriage, supported a state constitutional amendment to ban same-sex marriage in 2012, and joined legal efforts to defend the ban. However, in 2017, when a group of the state House's most conservative Republicans proposed legislation that would declare "null and void" the U.S. Supreme Court decision in Obergefell v. Hodges (2015) (which held that there is a constitutional right to same-sex marriage), Moore blocked the bill from advancing in the state House.

In 2014 Moore was one of the state House's biggest campaign fundraisers. His skill at fundraising for the Republican Party contributed to his election as speaker of the North Carolina House in 2015.

Moore and State Senator Harry Brown were the top two North Carolina lawmakers to gain substantial earmarked funding for their districts in the 2015 state budget, securing a collective total of $19 million. Moore defended his use of earmarks for projects in his district.

Speaker of the House
Moore was a sponsor in 2016 of House Bill 2, a controversial "bathroom bill" barring transgender individuals from using bathrooms that conform to their gender identity. After the U.S. Department of Justice said that the legislation violated federal anti-discrimination law and demanded that the state cease implementation, Moore rejected the DOJ's position and accused the Obama administration of "bullying," saying, "The deadline will come and go. We will take no action."

Moore has opposed curbs on gerrymandering in North Carolina. In a legal suit against partisan gerrymandering in the state, Moore and his state Senate counterpart (Republican Phil Berger) urged the U.S. Supreme Court to overturn a lower court's ruling that the partisan gerrymandering of North Carolina's congressional districts was unconstitutional.

In 2018, Moore won a third term as speaker of the House.

In 2018, following a mass shooting at Stoneman Douglas High School in Parkland, Florida, Moore established a North Carolina House Select Committee on School Safety. Moore rejected Democratic proposals to discuss changes to gun laws, and the committee never took up gun control proposals. Moore instead proposed the use of volunteer officers to guard schools.

In 2019, a controversy took place after emails came to light, showing that in 2016, a high-ranking aide to Moore had corresponded with the North Carolina Department of Environmental Quality (DEQ) about a Siler City chicken processing plant co-owned by Moore that was being offered for sale. At the aide's request, DEQ approved the plant's participation in a state subsidy program that provided $22,000 for the repair of a leaking underground storage tank at the factory, which may have aided in the sale of the plant. The revelation prompted the Campaign for Accountability to file a complaint with the North Carolina State Ethics Commission. Moore denied knowledge of the emails. A previous complaint against Moore regarding the Siler City chicken plant was dismissed in 2018.

In 2019, Democratic Governor Roy Cooper vetoed the state budget. On the morning of September 11, 2019 during a calendared legislative session Moore called a vote to override the veto of the state budget. The override passed on a vote of 55-9. Nearly half of members were absent during the vote, most of the absent members were Democrats. Democrats in the state House were greatly angered by the Republicans' move, saying that Moore and other House Republican leaders had made assurances that no votes would be called during the morning session.  Moore defended the vote and said that he had made no pledges that no vote would take place.

In 2021, a new 13th congressional district was created that included Moore's home of Cleveland County. While Moore was expected to run for the seat, he said he would not after Madison Cawthorn announced his candidacy. Moore said he would run for another House term.

Personal life
Moore is divorced, and has two sons.

Ethics investigations
Moore has been investigated for state ethics violations. None of the allegations have resulted in charges of wrongdoing.

In 2015, an article written by a local journalist prompted an FBI inquiry into Tim Moore's campaign reports. The FBI declined to comment on the inquiry and the bureau never filed charges regarding the allegations of wrongdoing.

In 2019, Moore's legislative aides engaged with the state Department of Environmental Quality (DEQ) in regards to a property Moore owned. Moore and his business partners sold that property to Mountaire Farms, an Arkansas-based poultry conglomerate that is a donor to North Carolina Republicans, for a 650% profit. The N.C. State Board of Elections and Ethics reviewed the complaint and information resulting from the staff's investigation. However the investigating panel from the State Elections and Ethics Board unanimously voted to dismiss the complaint upon conclusion of their inquiry.

Electoral history

2020

2018

2016

2014

2012

2010

2008

2006

2004

2002

References

|-

Living people
1970 births
People from Kings Mountain, North Carolina
Oklahoma City University School of Law alumni
University of North Carolina at Chapel Hill alumni
21st-century American politicians
Speakers of the North Carolina House of Representatives
Republican Party members of the North Carolina House of Representatives